The Favorite Stove & Range Company was an American manufacturer from the late 19th to the mid-20th centuries.

In 1887 the Favorite Stove & Range Company moved to Piqua, Ohio from Cincinnati, Ohio.  The firm became Piqua's largest manufacturer.  The company was also the first new business to be brought to Piqua by the Piqua Board of Trade, a predecessor of the present Chamber of Commerce.  Piqua became known as the "Favorite City".  When many of the employees of the firm settled on the top of South Street Hill it became known as "Favorite Hill".

The factory was built on the south end of the Hydraulic Canal on what is now South College Street at South Street. The eight acre (3.2 hectare) factory site was bounded by College, Young, Weber and South Streets.  By 1896, the firm had over three hundred employees and was producing over fifty thousand stoves a year. The death of owner Stanhope Boal in 1933 and the devastation of the Great Depression led to the company's liquidation in 1935.  A portion of the firm remained in business under the name The Favorite Stove Company, producing furnaces and stove parts. The firm suspended operations for the final time in 1958.

References 

Home appliance manufacturers of the United States